Lawrie Glacier is a glacier flowing between Mount Genecand and Mezzo Buttress, and entering the head of Barilari Bay between Cherkovna Point and Prestoy Point on the west coast of Graham Land, Antarctica. It was charted by the British Graham Land Expedition under Rymill, 1934–37, and was named by the UK Antarctic Place-Names Committee in 1959 for Robert Lawrie, an English alpine and polar equipment specialist.

References

External links
 Australian Antarctic Data Centre entry

Glaciers of Graham Coast